Christine Margaret Russell (née Carr, born 25 March 1945) is a British Labour Party politician who was the Member of Parliament (MP) for the City of Chester from 1997 to 2010. She lost her seat to the Conservative Stephen Mosley at the 2010 general election.

Early life

Russell was born at Holbeach, Lincolnshire, a farmer's daughter from South Holland. She was educated at the single-sex Spalding High School. She studied at the Polytechnic of North West London (became the University of North London), then went to the London School of Librarianship. She gained the Professional Librarianship Qualification. She worked as a librarian for the Borough of Camden from 1967 to 1970, the University of Glasgow from 1970 to 1971, and Dunbartonshire County Council from 1971 to 1973. From 1989 to 1994, she worked for some MEPs, then for MIND from 1994 to 1997.

Parliamentary career
From 1992 to 1993, Russell served as Sheriff of Chester.

She was one of three councillors for College Ward on Chester City Council, until she resigned after her victory at the 1997 general election. She was expected to be elected as Lord Mayor of Chester had she not been elected to parliament.

At the 1997 general election in an all-women shortlist as the Labour candidate for City of Chester. She was elected as Member of Parliament in that election, unseating Gyles Brandreth. In Parliament she became Parliamentary Private Secretary (PPS) to Beverley Hughes.

She had a majority of 915.

Russell lost her seat in 2010 to the Conservative Stephen Mosley.

Personal life
She married Dr James Russell in 1971 in Hampstead. They have a son and daughter, and divorced in 1991.

References

External links
 Chester Labour
 Guardian Unlimited Politics - Ask Aristotle: Christine Russell MP
 TheyWorkForYou.com - Christine Russell MP
 
 BBC Politics page 

1945 births
Living people
Labour Party (UK) MPs for English constituencies
UK MPs 1997–2001
UK MPs 2001–2005
UK MPs 2005–2010
Female members of the Parliament of the United Kingdom for English constituencies
People from Holbeach
Councillors in Manchester
Alumni of the University of North London
People educated at Spalding High School, Lincolnshire
20th-century British women politicians
21st-century British women politicians
20th-century English women
20th-century English people
21st-century English women
21st-century English people
Women councillors in England